Amir Arsenovich Dzhumayev (born 20 March 1998) is a Russian football player.

Before 2022, he was known as Aleksandr Dzhumayev.

Club career
He made his debut in the Russian Professional Football League for FC Kuban-2 Krasnodar on 28 July 2016 in a game against FC Spartak Vladikavkaz.

He made his debut for the main squad of FC Kuban Krasnodar on 24 August 2016 in a Russian Cup game against FC Energomash Belgorod.

He made his Russian Football National League debut for Kuban on 18 November 2017 in a game against FC Tyumen.

References

External links
 Profile by Russian Professional Football League

1998 births
People from Khabezsky District
Sportspeople from Karachay-Cherkessia
Living people
Russian footballers
Association football midfielders
FC Kuban Krasnodar players
FC Urozhay Krasnodar players
FC Mordovia Saransk players
FC Armavir players
FC Dynamo Bryansk players
FC Mashuk-KMV Pyatigorsk players